The Tata Magic Iris is a 3-door, 4- or 5-seater cabover microvan/minivan (MPV) manufactured by the Indian automaker Tata Motors. Powered by a 600cc one-cylinder diesel engine, it is intended to compete with auto-rickshaws.
With its engine delivering  and 31 Nm of torque, the vehicle has a top speed of just .

The Magic Iris is made using an all steel body and frame – reinforced by reverse hat section chassis rails and beams, welded under its floor.
The vehicle features all-around independent suspension with coil springs – MacPherson struts in the front, and semi-trailing arms in the rear.

It uses a cabover design, meaning the driver seating on top of the front axle and the engine mounted at the rear, and with a vehicle length 1 cm shorter than the 1957 Fiat 500, the Magic Iris is one of the shortest four-seater cars ever produced — however its limited top speed would prohibit actually registering it as a car in many countries.

See also
 Tata Ace Zip
 Kei car

References

2010s cars
Cab over vehicles
Cars introduced in 2010
Microvans
Minivans
Rear-engined vehicles
Rear-wheel-drive vehicles
Magic Iris